Serpiginous, first known to be used in the 15th century, is a term from Latin serpere to creep, usually referring to a creeping, snakelike or slowly progressive skin disease.

It is used to describe the rash in cutaneous larvae migrans, erythema annulare centrifugum, purpura annularis telangiectoides, ringworm, balanitis circinata, and some cases of bullous pemphigoid.

It is also used to describe serpiginous choroiditis, a rare eye condition in which irregularly shaped (serpiginous) lesions are seen in two layers of the eye surface (the choriocapillaris and the retinal pigment epithelium).

References

Dermatologic terminology